Jupally Krishna Rao (born 10 August 1955) is an Indian politician and was Minister of Telangana. He was elected as  MLA in the Telangana Legislative Assembly from Kollapur and won elections 5 times. He lost in 2018 assembly elections.

Early life
Jupally Krishna Rao was born in Pedda Dagada village in Mahbubnagar district, Telangana, India.
In 2018 general election, Jupally Krishna Rao was defeated from TRS Party.

Career
Jupally Krishna Rao started his career as a bank employee and gradually succeeded in construction business.
He was elected as an MLA from Kollapur constituency in Mahbubnagar district in 1999, 2004, 2009, 2012 by-elections & 2014. 
He was earlier a Minister for Food, Civil supplies, Legal Metrology, Consumer affairs in Sri YS Rajasekhar Reddy's cabinet. Later in Kiran Kumar Reddy's cabinet, he was given Endowment Ministry in Andhra Pradesh.
He is the first MLA from Kollapur Constituency who got elected 5 times consecutively.

He quit Congress Party and joined Telangana Rashtra Samithi on 30 October 2011.

He lost in 2018 Assembly Elections. He is not an MLA now.

Personal life
Jupally Krishna Rao is married to Sujana. They have two sons,
elder son is Varun Jupally and younger is Arun Jupally.

References

Telugu politicians
Politicians from Hyderabad, India
Telangana Rashtra Samithi politicians
Telangana MLAs 2014–2018
Living people
1955 births
Indian National Congress politicians from Telangana
Members of the Andhra Pradesh Legislative Assembly